Mervyn King may refer to:

Mervyn King, Baron King of Lothbury (born 1948), British economist, former governor of the Bank of England
Mervyn King (judge) (born 1937), former judge of the Supreme Court of South Africa and chairman of the King Committee on Corporate Governance
Mervyn King (darts player) (born 1966), British darts player
Mervyn King (bowls) (born 1966), English bowls player

See also 

Mervin King (1914–2008), Los Angeles Police Captain